Kharian, is a city located within the Gujrat District of the Punjab province of Pakistan.  Kharian is the headquarters of Kharian Tehsil. According to 2017 Census of Pakistan, it has a population of about 87,419. 

It is known as Little Norway of Pakistan because more than 70 percent of Pakistanis in Norway belong to this area.

Military
Major Aziz Bhatti, one of the recipients of the Nishan Hyder, also belongs to this tehsil. The largest military cantonment of Pakistan is also present in this city.

Notable people 
 Muhammad Alam Lohar, (1928 - 3 July 1979), Prominent Punjabi folk music singer.
 Major Raja Aziz Bhatti Shaheed (1928 - 10 September 1965) Received Pakistan's highest award for valor (Nishan-e-Haider)

 Fazal Ilahi Chaudhry  was the fifth President of Pakistan.
 Ismat Beg Scientist

See also
 Kharian Cantonment

References 

Populated places in Gujrat District
Indo-Pakistani War of 1965